Arthur Samuel may refer to:
 Arthur Samuel (computer scientist), American computer scientist
 Arthur Samuel, 1st Baron Mancroft, British politician

See also